There are 111 officially notified Inland National Waterways (NWs) in India identified for the purposes of inland water transport,
as per The National Waterways Act, 2016. Out of the 111 NWs, 106 were created in 2016. The NW network covers around 20,275.5 km. NW-1, 2, & 3 are already operational.  Cargo as well as passenger / cruise vessels are plying on these waterways.  Detailed Project Report (DPR) for development of NW-4 & 5 was completed in 2010. The DPR of NW 5 was updated in 2014.  For the newly declared 106 NWs, techno-economic feasibility studies have been initiated.

National waterways in India handled 55 million tonne (MT) in 2017-18 and 72 MT in 2018-19 cargo respectively, and expected to reach 100 MT by fy 2021-22.

List

See also
 List of rivers of India
 Multi-Modal Logistics Parks in India
 National Waterways Act, 2016
 RORO ferries in India
 Sagar Mala project
 UDAN
 Waterways transport in Kerala

Notes

NW110 
Wazirabad barrage (north Delhi)-Palla (disambiguation) (north Faridabad) perennial section is being developed for the passenger and cargo ferry service.  Okhla barrage-Agra steamer service is planned by the end of June 2017 with the help of Netherlands (c. Feb 2017).

References

 
W
India, National Waterways
India geography-related lists
Proposed infrastructure in India